The National Council for the Revolutionary Command (NCRC) is the twenty-man council set up to rule Syria after the 1963 Syrian coup d'état.

The NCRC was composed of 12 Ba'athists and eight Nasserists and independents. Its exact membership was kept secret for the first few months. Though some civilians were admitted, it was dominated by military officers.

Within the NCRC, the military officers created a committee to hold the real power described as a "Junta with in a Junta."

References

Ba'athism
1963 establishments in Syria
History of the Ba'ath Party
Military dictatorships
Political history of Syria
Provisional governments
Government of Syria